Foreigner is the debut studio album by British-American rock band Foreigner, released on 8 March 1977. It spun off three hit singles, "Feels Like the First Time", "Cold as Ice" and "Long, Long Way from Home". It also features album tracks such as "Headknocker" and "Starrider", the latter of which features a rare lead vocal from lead guitarist and co-founder Mick Jones.

Writing and recording
Jones had written several songs that wound up on Foreigner prior to the formation of the band.  Lead singer Lou Gramm sang three of them – "Feels Like the First Time", "Woman, Oh Woman" and "At War with the World" in his audition to form the band.  After the formation of the band, Gramm and Jones worked on several other songs, including "Long, Long Way from Home" (along with Ian McDonald), "Cold as Ice" and "I Need You".

McDonald claimed that although he received a writing credit only on "Long, Long Way from Home" he had a significant role in writing several of the other songs on the album.  According to McDonald: 

Jones had wanted Roy Thomas Baker to produce the album, but he was not available.  Instead, Sarm Studios owners Gary Lyons, who had worked as an engineer on several Queen albums that Baker produced, and John Sinclair served as producers along with Jones and McDonald.  There is some disagreement about the roles that Jones and McDonald played in producing the album.  According to Lyons:

On the other hand, Jones says that: 

The first attempt at mixing the album was done at Sarm Studios, London, but as they were dissatisfied with the result, the album was re-mixed at Atlantic Recording Studios by Jones, McDonald and Jimmy Douglass.

Reception
Los Angeles Times critic Robert Hilburn summed up his contemporary review of Foreigner saying "The production work is crisp, the melodies are serviceable and the vocals are eager. But there is far too little point of view to make any of it commanding."  Hartford Courant critic Henry McNulty said "There's something good beginning here, and the sooner you get in on it the better."  Annison Star reviewer Mike Stamler felt that most of the songs were "sanforized, sanitized and safely sterilized into three basic chords" with "immature lyrics," leaving little variety on the album, and suggested that more instrumental solos would have been beneficial.

Allmusic critic Andy Hinds said that for suburban teenagers in the 1970s the "immaculate rock sound" on Foreigner "was the perfect soundtrack for cruising through well-manicured neighborhoods in their Chevy Novas," and praised the band's "pure rock craftsmanship."

PopMatters critic Evan Sawdey felt that the non-single album tracks on Foreigner were more successful than their counterparts on subsequent Foreigner albums.  He explicitly called out the artiness and folkiness of “Starrider”, the "casual creep" of “The Damage is Done” and the "fiery" “I Need You”, although he did say that “Woman Oh Woman” "started skirting into cheesy ballad territory" and that its "lead synth line has not aged well at all."

Billboard reviewer Gary Graff rated four of the songs from Foreigner (the three singles plus "Headknocker") among the ten greatest Foreigner songs.  Graff described "Headknocker" as a "gritty, stomping rocker."  Classic Rock History critic Brian Kachejian rated three songs from Foreigner as being among the band's top 10 songs; "Feels Like the First Time", "Cold as Ice" and "Fool for You Anyway."  Kachejian called "Fool for You Anyway" a "great grooving ballad" with "a bit of an Eagles feel."

Classic Rock critic Malcolm Dome rated two songs from Foreigner as being among Foreigner's 10 most underrated – "Starrider" at #7 and "Long, Long Way from Home" at #4.  Dome calls Starrider a "beautifully developed, introspective tale of aspiration," even though it doesn't sound much like Foreigner and its lyrics "come across as 50s pulp sci fi."  Ultimate Classic Rock critic Eduardo Rivadavia also rated two songs from Foreigner among the band's 10 most underrated – "Fool for You Anyway" at #6 and "Long, Long Way from Home" at #2.

Jones has rated four songs from the album ("Long, Long Way from Home," "Cold as Ice," "The Damage Is Done" and "Fool for You Anyway") as being among his 11 favorite Foreigner songs.

Track listing

Personnel 
Foreigner
 Lou Gramm – lead vocals, percussion
 Mick Jones – keyboards, lead guitars, backing vocals, lead vocals (3, 7)
 Ian McDonald – keyboards, guitars, saxophone, flute, backing vocals
 Al Greenwood – keyboards, synthesizers
 Ed Gagliardi – bass, backing vocals
 Dennis Elliott – drums, backing vocals

Additional personnel
 Ian Lloyd – backing vocals

In July 2010, the audiophile label Mobile Fidelity Sound Lab released this album on the Super Audio Compact Disc (SACD) format. It is presented in a "Mini Vinyl" replica cardboard case but omits the bonus tracks.

Production 
 Producers – Gary Lyons and John Sinclair, in collaboration with Mick Jones and Ian McDonald.
 Engineer – Gary Lyons
 Assistant Engineers – Jimmy Douglass, Michael Getlin, Kevin Herron and Randy Mason.
 Mixing – Jimmy Douglass, Mick Jones and Ian McDonald.
 Basic Tracks recorded at The Hit Factory and Atlantic Recording Studios. 
 Overdubs recorded at Atlantic Recording Studios. 
 Mixed at Atlantic Recording Studios.
 Mastered by George Piros at Atlantic Recording Studios.
 Art Direction – Bob Defrin
 Cover Illustrations – Alex Gnidziejko

Charts

Certifications

References

Foreigner (band) albums
1977 debut albums
Albums produced by Mick Jones (Foreigner)
Atlantic Records albums